The 1997–98 Utah State Aggies men's basketball team represented Utah State University in the 1997–98 college basketball season. This was head coach Larry Eustachy's 5th and final season at Utah State. The Aggies played their home games at the Dee Glen Smith Spectrum and were members of the Big West Conference. They finished the season 25–8, 13–3 to finish atop the conference standings in the East division. They also won the Big West tournament to earn an automatic bid to the 1998 NCAA Division I men's basketball tournament as No. 13 seed in the West Region. The Aggies lost to No. 4 seed Maryland in the first round.

Roster 

Source

Schedule and results

|-
!colspan=9 style=| Non-conference regular season

|-
!colspan=9 style=| Big West Regular Season

|-
!colspan=9 style=| Big West tournament

|-
!colspan=10 style=| NCAA tournament

Source

References

Utah State
Utah State Aggies men's basketball seasons
Utah State
Aggies
Aggies